Van Sickle is a surname. Notable people with the surname include:

Bruce Van Sickle (1917–2007), American judge
Chad Van Sickle (born 1977), American boxer
Clyde Van Sickle (1907–1995), American football player
Frederick L. Van Sickle (born 1943), American judge
Hank Van Sickle (born 1961), American musician
Neil D. Van Sickle (1915–2019), United States Air Force general

See also
Van Sickle Bi-State Park, state park in California and Nevada, United States

Surnames of Dutch origin